Happily Ever After is a 2009 Hong Kong drama-romance film directed by Azrael Chung and Ivy Kong.

Plot
Au-yeung Goon-nam (Michelle Wai) and Sze Tso-chi (Ken Hung) share the same birthday, go to the same school, love photography, and are just as competitive. But they did not know of each other's existence until they “crossed swords” at a debate tournament. And they both felt as if the fairytale prince and princess finally found each other. Later in a birthday party, Nam thought Chi played a trick on her, leaving a slap on his face. Four years later, Nam encounters his ghost and learns that he is already dead ...

Cast
 Ken Hung - Sze Tso-chi
 Michelle Wai - Au-Yeung Goon-nam
 Carlos Chan - Chun Man
 Benz Hui
 Jacky Leung
 Gladys Fung
 A. Lin

Critical reception
Perry Lam of Muse Magazine gave the film a mixed review, writing that 'it's a decent commercial entertainment designed to satisfy our residual, vulgar longing for the intensely romantic.'

References

External links
 
 Happily Ever After at the Hong Kong Movie Database

2009 films
2000s Cantonese-language films
2009 romantic drama films
Hong Kong romantic drama films
2000s Hong Kong films